Khairkot District, also known as Katawaz or Zarghun Shar District, is a district of Paktika Province, Afghanistan. The district is within the heartland of the Sulaimankhel tribe of Ghilji Pashtuns. The district capital is Khairkot town.

In 1998, the district had an estimated population of over 75,000. However, by June 2004 the post-Taliban government separated off three new districts from the large Khairkot District. The new districts were Janikhel District, Yahyakhel District and Yusufkhel District. The district population in 2004 of the reduced district was 38,024.

History
On 3 May 2020, the Taliban threw a hand grenade into a mosque in Khairkot District, injuring 20 worshippers who were offering the night prayer after having broken their Ramadan fast.

References

External links
 "Zarghun Shahr District: Zarghun Shahr District: Afghanistan" map, January 2004, Afghanistan Information Management Service (AIMS); showing the larger district that existed before June 2004.

Districts of Paktika Province